Danaru is a Rai Coast language of Papua New Guinea. It is spoken in the single village of Danaru in Usino Rural LLG, Madang Province, Papua New Guinea.

References

Rai Coast languages
Languages of Madang Province